Bárður or Bardur is a Nordic masculine given name that derives from the Old Norse name Bárðr . It may refer to
Bárður Eyþórsson, Icelandic basketball coach 
Bárður Háberg (born 1979), Faroese musician, songwriter and composer
Bárður Hansen (born 1992), Faroese footballer 
Bárður Oskarsson (born 1972), Faroese children's writer, illustrator and artist
Bárður á Steig Nielsen (born 1972), Faroese politician and businessman

Faroese masculine given names
Icelandic masculine given names